The second series of the British historical drama television series Downton Abbey broadcast from 18 September 2011 to 6 November 2011, comprising a total of eight episodes and one Christmas Special episode broadcast on 25 December 2011. The series was broadcast on ITV in the United Kingdom and on PBS in the United States, which supported the production as part of its Masterpiece Classic anthology. Series two explores the lives of the Crawley family and servants during and after the First World War.

Series two received widespread acclaim, with critics praising its cast, historical depictions, and story's arc. The viewing figures significantly increased compared with series one, with an average of 11 million viewers per episode. The series was nominated for several industry awards, and won the TCA Award for Outstanding Achievement in Movies, Miniseries and Specials. Maggie Smith received critical praise for her performance as Lady Violet Crawley, which earned her the Primetime Emmy Award for Outstanding Supporting Actress in a Drama Series and the Golden Globe Award for Best Supporting Actress – Series, Miniseries or Television Film.

Series overview
The second series covers the last two years of the war and the first year of peace. Events mentioned or directly affecting the Crawley household include the Battle of the Somme, the Easter Rising, the Battle of Arras, the Russian Revolution, the Battle of Passchendaele, the Battle of Amiens, the Battle of Vittorio Veneto, the Armistice, and the Spanish flu epidemic.

On the domestic front there is a serious shortage of able-bodied men for home front jobs.  Matthew Crawley and William Mason go off to fight, while Thomas Barrow joins the Medical Corps. Tom Branson, as an Irishman, won't fight for Britain. Robert Crawley (Hugh Bonneville) returns to uniform, but is refused active service due to his age. Sybil Crawley (Jessica Brown Findlay) defies her aristocratic position and joins the Voluntary Aid Detachment as a nurse.

In the biggest development, Downton Abbey becomes a convalescent home for wounded officers.

Cast and characters

Main cast

Upstairs
Hugh Bonneville as Robert Crawley, Earl of Grantham
Jessica Brown Findlay as Lady Sybil Crawley
Laura Carmichael as Lady Edith Crawley
Michelle Dockery as Lady Mary Crawley
Elizabeth McGovern as Cora Crawley, Countess of Grantham
Maggie Smith as Violet Crawley, Dowager Countess of Grantham
Dan Stevens as Mr Matthew Crawley
Penelope Wilton as Mrs Isobel Crawley

Downstairs
Jim Carter as Mr Charles Carson; the Butler
Phyllis Logan as Mrs Elsie Hughes; the Housekeeper
Brendan Coyle as Mr John Bates; Lord Grantham's valet
Siobhan Finneran as Sarah O'Brien; Lady Grantham's maid
Joanne Froggatt as Miss Anna Smith; head housemaid
Thomas Howes as Mr William Mason; Second Footman
Rob James-Collier as Mr Thomas Barrow; First Footman
Lesley Nicol as Mrs Beryl Patmore; the Cook
Sophie McShera as Daisy Robinson; a kitchen maid
Amy Nuttall as Miss Ethel Parks; a housemaid
Allen Leech as Tom Branson; Grantham's chauffeur

Recurring and guest cast

 Samantha Bond as Lady Rosamund Painswick; Lord Grantham's sister (Recurring)
 Robert Bathurst as Sir Anthony Strallan; Crawley family friend (Guest)
 Kevin Doyle as Joseph Molesley; Matthew Crawley's valet (Recurring) 
 Brendan Patricks as The Hon Evelyn Napier; Suitor for Lady Mary (Recurring)
 Cal MacAninch as Henry Lang (Recurring)
 Iain Glen as Sir Richard Carlisle of Morningside (Recurring)
 Maria Doyle Kennedy as Vera Bates (Recurring)
 Jonathan Coy as George Murray; Lord Grantham's lawyer (Guest) 
 Paul Copley as Mr Mason (Recurring)
 Michael Cochrane as Reverend Albert Travis (Recurring)
 Clare Calbraith as Jane Moorsum (Recurring)
 Kevin R. McNally as Horace Bryant (Recurring)
 Lachlan Nieboer as Lt Edward Courtenay (Guest)
 Julian Wadham as Sir Herbert Strutt (Guest)	
 Trevor White as Maj Patrick Gordon (Guest)
 Nigel Havers as Lord Hepworth (Guest, Christmas special)
 Sharon Small as Marigold Shore (Guest, Christmas special)
 Zoe Boyle as Lavinia Swire (Recurring)
 Christine Lohr as May Bird (Guest)
 Christine Mackie as Daphne Bryant (Recurring)
 Daniel Pirrie as Major Charles Bryant 
 Stephen Ventura as Davis (Recurring)

Episodes
A 46-minute documentary compiled in anticipation of the Christmas 2011 two-hour special broadcast, Behind the Drama features behind-the-scenes footage from the filming of the series and short interviews with Julian Fellowes, the writer, actors (Elizabeth McGovern, Joanne Froggatt, Brendan Coyle, Dan Stevens, Michelle Dockery, Jessica Brown Findlay, Laura Carmichael, Penelope Wilton, Phyllis Logan, Thomas Howes, Lesley Nicol, Sophie McShera, Allen Leech), and other members of the team that produces Downton Abbey. It was shown in the United Kingdom at 7:30 pm on Wednesday 21 December 2011 and narrated by Hugh Bonneville. 4.5 million people watched the show.

Production
Filming began in March 2011. The scripts were written by series creator Julian Fellowes. Episodes were directed by Ashley Pearce, Andy Goddard, Brian Kelly and James Strong. Cal Macaninch, Iain Glen, Amy Nuttall, Zoe Boyle and Maria Doyle Kennedy joined the cast respectively as the new valet Lang, Sir Richard Carlisle, the new housemaid Ethel, Lavinia Swire and John Bates' wife Vera. Nigel Havers and Sharon Small appeared in the Christmas Special as Lord Hepworth and Marigold Shore, Rosamund Painswick's maid, respectively.

Reception
Series two was highly acclaimed.  On Rotten Tomatoes, it has fresh rating of 100% based on 24 reviews, with a weighted average of 8.9/10. The site's critical consensus reads, "With its excellent cast and resplendent period trappings, Downton Abbey continues to weave a bewitching, ingratiating spell." On Metacritic, the series 2 has a normalized score of 85 out of 100 based on 26 critics, indicating "Universal Acclaim". 

The series generally received overwhelming reviews from critics. Linda Stasi of the New York Post wrote the second series "seamlessly moves between the horrors of war and the gentility of life in the show's titular 100-room manor." Writing for TV Guide Magazine, Matt Roush said, "For those of us who hungered for a year to witness these new chapters, the appetite is insatiable." The Wall Street Journals television critic Dorothy Rabinowitz said, "The vibrant brew of upstairs-downstairs relationships is more savory now, the characters more complicated." Robert Bianco of USA Today also lauded the series saying, "There's nothing in Downton you won't recognize, and almost nothing you won't enjoy." Varietys chief television critic Brian Lowry praised the series cast and said the creator had "created such a vivid group of characters and assembled such an impeccable cast--effortlessly oscillating from comedy to drama--that the hours fly by, addictively pulling viewers from one into the next." Tim Goodman of The Hollywood Reporter said, "The characters are so beautifully and thoroughly rendered that we, as viewers, are caught up in their lives." Robert Lioyd of the Los Angeles Times said, "It is big, beautiful, beautifully acted and romantic, its passions expressed with that particular British reserve that serves only to make them burn brighter."

Some media outlets and critics were more critical towards the show.  Pittsburgh Post-Gazette TV critic Rob Owen wrote, "Writer/series creator Julian Fellowes weaves together an engrossing tapestry of stories, although some of them stretch credulity or peter out." Alessandra Stanley of The New York Times also gave the series moderate reviews by comparison to the first series and said, "Season 2 is in many ways as captivating and addictive as the first, but this time around, the series comes off as a shameless throwback to itself." In a moderate review, Maureen Ryan of The Huffington Post said, "Your investment in the many stories spun out by creator Julian Fellowes may take longer to develop this year, because the costume drama's pace is off in the early going and it's far more contrived and inconsistent than it was in its first season." In a less enthusiastic review for The Washington Post, Hank Stuever quipped that the series, "lacks surprise and is stretched precariously thin, a house full of fascinating people with not nearly enough to do, all caught in a loop of weak storylines that circle round but never fully propel."

Awards and nominations
<div class="noprint">

Notes and references

Notes

References

External links
 

2011 British television seasons